Kangaru may refer to:

Kangaru, Iran
Kangaru, Kurdistan, Iran
Kangaru, Kenya
"Kangaru", a track from the score for the 2016 film Arrival

See also
Kangaroo